Rampage Knights is a 2015 indie video game by Czech developer Rake in Grass.

Development 
The game is inspired by The Binding of Isaac and Golden Axe. It was announced on 8 March 2013 as a mixture of fast action beat 'em up game and dungeon crawler with a focus for exploration.

The developers later changed their plans so the game was to be more linear because the map with exploring was causing too much frustration. The developers also released a playable demo and started an Indiegogo campaign and a Steam Greenlight campaign. The game was Greenlighted on 11 June 2014 but the Indiegogo campaign was unsuccessful. The developers then announced they plan to finish the game. Unsuccess on Indiegogo means stripping of the unnecessary extra features intended. They also mentioned of a possibility that the game will be released in Early Access.

The game was released as early access on 29 March 2015. The game was released on 4 September.

Gameplay 
The player controls a Knight who fights enemies in a procedurally generated dungeon. He can upgrade his character as he progresses in the game and also buy him better equipment. The player can also unlock new characters. The fighting system is based on Golden Axe. The game can also be played in cooperative multiplayer on one computer.

Reception
The game has received positive reviews from critics. It holds 80% on Metacritic.

References

External links 

2015 video games
Arcade video games
Fantasy video games
Fighting games
Indie video games
MacOS games
Roguelike video games
Steam Greenlight games
Video games developed in the Czech Republic
Windows games
Early access video games
Rake in Grass games
Multiplayer and single-player video games